Times Square Playboy is a 1936 American romance film directed by William C. McGann and starring Warren William, June Travis and Barton MacLane. It is also known by the alternative title of His Best Man. The film's art direction was by Esdras Hartley, its costume design by Orry-Kelly.

Plot
Hardworking New York City stockbroker Vic Arnold is elated to announce at a business meeting that Beth Calhoun has agreed to marry him. He invites his best friend, Ben "Pig Head" Bancroft, to come from his home town of Big Bend, Indiana, to be his best man.

However, Ben becomes convinced that the much younger Beth is only marrying Vic for his money and that she is secretly still attached to college football star and admirer Joe Roberts, who is about her age. Despite the efforts of his wife Lottie, he accuses Beth of being a gold digger, and her brother Wally and their parents of complicity. Insulted, Beth makes Vic choose between them. Vic refuses to give up his best friend, so Beth gives him back his engagement ring.

Later, Ben finds out he was mistaken. Wally returns a $40,000 bracelet Vic gave Beth; he also reveals that Joe, who has repeatedly proposed to Beth, is actually much richer than Vic. However, when Vic opens the jewelry case, it is empty. The Calhouns show up to defend themselves from the insinuation that Beth kept the bracelet. Ben then admits he hid it in order to bring everybody together. He even resorts to putting Wally in a half nelson to get him to stay and listen to his heartfelt apology. In the end, he succeeds in reuniting the couple.

Cast
 Warren William as Victor "Vic" Arnold  
 June Travis as Beth Calhoun, aka Fay Melody  
 Barton MacLane as Casey, Vic's butler / trainer  
 Gene Lockhart as P.H. Ben "Pig Head" Bancroft  
 Kathleen Lockhart as Lottie Bancroft
 Dick Purcell as Wally Calhoun  
 Craig Reynolds as Joe Roberts  
 Granville Bates as Mr. Mort Calhoun  
 Dorothy Vaughan as Mrs. Nellie Calhoun

Reception
The New York Times gave the film a lukewarm review, calling it "a noisy comedy which manages to be alternately amusing and dull" and "suffers in the main because it is too reverent an adaptation of the parent work", though the "principal rôles are in capable hands and are played for what they are worth by Warren William and Gene and Kathleen Lockhart".

References

Bibliography
 John Stangeland. Warren William: Magnificent Scoundrel of Pre-Code Hollywood. McFarland, 2010.

External links
 
 

1936 films
1936 romantic comedy films
American black-and-white films
American romantic comedy films
American films based on plays
Films directed by William C. McGann
Films set in New York City
Warner Bros. films
Films scored by Heinz Roemheld
1930s English-language films
1930s American films